Alnetin is a flavone isolated from Lindera lucida.

References 

Flavones